Shantaveri Gopala Gowda (14 March 1923 – 9 June 1972) was a socialist politician who was thrice elected to Karnataka Vidhanasabha, the Legislative Assembly of Karnataka, in 1952, 1962 and 1967.

Gopala Gowda was born in Sagara, Karnataka to a Vokkaliga family. He is considered one of India's most important socialist leaders, and a pioneer of socialism in Karnataka. He was influenced by Ram Manohar Lohia. His leadership began as early as 1951. He was considered "charismatic" and he gained many followers.

He mentored several socialists in Karnataka including J.H.Patel, Bangarappa, S. M. Krishna and D. Devaraj Urs, who became the chief ministers of the state. Urs was inspired and understood the depth of Gopala Gowda's mind and life which was devoted to the poor and working classes, especially the farmers. The Land Reforms Act and renaming of the state from Mysore to Karnataka are thanks to his association with Gopala Gowda.

Upon the publication of his biography, N. Dharam Singh, chief minister of Karnataka, said that "the agitation and the political contribution of the late Shantaveri Gopala Gowda are significant in the history of the Legislature".

He was a firebrand politician who knew the culture of the land, and being a villager himself had a great following among the farmer community of Karnataka. A well-read person with a strong love for the Kannada language, he had been a friend to many intellectual and sensitive literary figures of Karnataka like the poet Gopalakrishna Adiga, the novelist Dr. U.R. Ananthamurthy, the writer and journalist P. Lankesh, and the farmers' association leader M. D. Nanjundaswamy.  In fact, Dr. Ananthamurthy wrote the novel Avasthe ("State of Life") based on the life of Gopala Gowda. It was also made into a sensitive film of the same name in 1987 with actor Anant Nag playing the lead role. A real idealist and daredevil leader his 'Kagodu satyagraha' – the indefinite fast he held to provide justice to the farmers of Karnataka – is evergreen in the minds of Karnataka people. His death at an early age heralded the slow demise of socialist movement in Karnataka. M. D. Nanjundaswamy, was one of the few leaders to carry forward the movement along the lines that Gowda had envisaged. Gowda's political role was pivotal as it once again drew the attention of the nation on the plight of the farmers.

References

External links
Matadar.org: Leader Of The Month
Talk: Everybody’s Leader

1923 births
1972 deaths
People from Shimoga
Indian socialists
Karnataka politicians